Nowe Życie (Polish for New Life) was a Polish-language fortnightly newspaper published in Warsaw, Poland. Nowe Życie was an organ of the General Jewish Labour Bund in Poland.

References

General Jewish Labour Bund in Poland
Polish-language newspapers
Defunct newspapers published in Poland
Jewish Polish history
Socialism in Poland
Newspapers published in Warsaw